The 2015 Cork Senior Hurling Championship was the 127th staging of the Cork Senior Hurling Championship since its establishment by the Cork County Board in 1887. The draw for the 2015 fixtures took place on 14 December 2014 at Páirc Uí Chaoimh. The championship began on 11 April 2015 and ended on 11 October 2015.

The championship was won by Glen Rovers who secured the title following a 2-17 to 1-13 defeat of Sarsfields in the final. This was their 26th championship title, their first in 26 years.

Sarsfield's were the defending champions.

Team changes

To Championship

Promoted from the Cork Premier Intermediate Hurling Championship
 Ballyhea

From Championship

Relegated to the Cork Premier Intermediate Hurling Championship
 Courcey Rovers

Summaries

Results

Divisions/Colleges

First round

Second round

Third round

Relegation play-off

Fourth round

Quarter-finals

Semi-finals

Final

Championship statistics

Scoring
First goal of the championship: D. J. O'Sullivan for Duhallow against Carbery (Divisions/Colleges first round, 10 April 2015)

Miscellaneous

 Duhallow claim only their fourth opening round win since 1982 and their first since 2006.
 The final is played at Páirc Uí Rinn for the first time.
 Glen Rovers win the championship for the first time since 1989. The victory gives them their 26th title and puts them into second position on the all-time roll of honour.
 Ballyhea return to the senior championship for the first time since 2003

Top scorers
Overall

Single game

References

External links
 Cork GAA website

Cork Senior Hurling Championship
Cork Senior Hurling Championship